Jack Churchill (1906–1996) was a British soldier.

Jack Churchill may also refer to:

Jack Churchill (1880–1947), brother of Winston Churchill
Jack Churchill, a fictional character created by Mark Chadbourn

See also
John Churchill (disambiguation)